KFXV (channel 60) is a television station licensed to Harlingen, Texas, United States, serving as the Fox affiliate for the Lower Rio Grande Valley. It is owned by Entravision Communications alongside McAllen-licensed Univision affiliate KNVO (channel 48), Class A primary CW+ affiliate and secondary PBS member KCWT-CD (channel 21), and Class A UniMás affiliate KTFV-CD (channel 32). The stations share studios on North Jackson Road in McAllen, while KFXV's transmitter is located near La Feria, Texas.

Prior to being a Fox affiliate, KFXV had been the PBS member station for the Lower Rio Grande Valley as KZLN from 1982 to 1983 and KMBH between 1985 and 2014. It has operated as a commercial outlet since 2014. The station returned to the air in May 2020, assuming the Fox affiliation from two low-power TV stations also owned by Entravision: McAllen-licensed KMBH-LD and Brownsville-licensed KXFX-CD (channel 67), which today operate as translators of KFXV.

History

KZLN
On April 20, 1977, the Texas Consumer Education and Communications Development Committee, related to the Roman Catholic Diocese of Brownsville, filed an application to build a new television station on non-commercially reserved channel 44 in Harlingen; however, in October, TCECDC modified its application to specify channel 60—thus becoming a non-commercial station operating on a non-reserved commercial channel. The Federal Communications Commission (FCC) granted the committee a construction permit on January 24, 1979. The call letters KZLN were assigned in June for the new educational television outlet. Original plans called for the station to be on the air by December with a bilingual program schedule; however, opposition from Harlingen officials halted their original grant plans.

KZLN would also be beset by several years of delays in tower construction and facilities. (The transmitter tower was shared with another 1982 sign-on, KVEO-TV, whose owner contributed $96,000.) By the time KZLN began telecasting on May 5, 1982, the climate was poor for PBS due to major cutbacks by the Reagan administration that affected funding for public broadcasting. For cable viewers in the Valley, KZLN replaced KEDT of Corpus Christi.

As had been feared at launch, KZLN's road was rocky. In September, more than $150,000 of equipment was stolen and taken to Mexico, from where it was dispersed to Arkansas, California and elsewhere; the thieves would be arrested in Cancún in 1983, and some of the equipment was recovered. By December, the station's fundraising appeals warned, "Without your help, KZLN will not be able to continue to operate". In February 1983, the station managed to stay on the air thanks to a reprieve from the Central Power and Light Co., the local electric utility; at the time, channel 60 owed CPL more than $19,000, had just avoided a full staff walkout, and had its telephone service disconnected for nonpayment. The station made it to its first birthday, in large part under interim leadership and with station driving force Francisco Briones having resigned.

Poor support, however, prevented KZLN from continuing much further. With only 400 memberships and no local programming, the station ceased operating July 13, 1983.

Becoming KMBH
When KZLN folded, the diocese, by way of RGV Educational Broadcasting, Inc. stepped in to acquire the channel 60 license in a transaction approved by the FCC in December 1983. The diocese assumed a $36,000 tax liability and $15,000 in outstanding wages and forgave $356,000 in debt.

RGV Educational Broadcasting changed the call letters to KEDV; in August, the diocese announced a $1.2 million pledge to cover the start-up expenses for a new facility, to be located on diocesan land south of the Valley Baptist Medical Center in Harlingen, as well as a new tower at La Feria. At the time, a May 1985 start-up date was projected, though KEDV—which soon would take on its KMBH call letters after receiving a request from KEDT—got off to a slow start in fundraising. Channel 60 returned to the air, this time as KMBH, on October 8, 1985.

In November 2007, the management of KMBH demanded that Bruce Lee Smith, a reporter for Harlingen's Valley Morning Star and a former volunteer for KMBH in the 1990s, reveal his confidential sources, in exchange for the station's financial records that he requested. The station would later file a police report, citing that Smith was abusive to its secretary when he requested the records, a charge that Smith denied. KMBH would soon run hourly announcements on its radio and TV stations, questioning Smith's ethics.

In August 2008, Reymundo Peña, the Bishop of Brownsville, removed three of the seven KMBH board members, without comment; in the licensee's incorporation papers, it listed Peña as the sole member of RGV Educational Broadcasting, allowing him sole discretion to appoint or dismiss board members.

KMBH was one of at least two PBS members run by a religious organization (KBYU-TV in Provo, Utah, left PBS in 2018), and was formerly one of at least three PBS members owned at least in part by a Catholic-related organization (along with WXEL-TV in West Palm Beach, Florida, which was sold to a community group in 2012, and WLAE-TV in New Orleans, which left PBS in 2013). Because of the Catholic-based ownership, KMBH occasionally refused to show programming that is contrary to the Catholic faith—one example was a 2007 Frontline documentary, "Hand of God", which dealt with sex abuse by clergymen; the station only aired it the next day as part of PBS' automated overnight schedule at 1 a.m., drawing complaints from viewers in support of the program.

Conversion to commercial operation
On January 14, 2014, the Diocese announced its intention to file with the FCC to convert KMBH's license to a commercial license, with the intention to sign a local marketing agreement with, and sell the station to, MBTV Texas Valley LLC; the Diocese cited the expenses of running the station. Though KZLN/KMBH had always operated as non-commercial, public television stations, the 1979 decision to file for channel 60 instead of 44 meant that it operated on a non-reserved channel—unusual among PBS stations—allowing KMBH to be converted. The move raised questions about KMBH's continued operation as a PBS member, though it was stated that efforts would be made to keep PBS programming available in the Rio Grande Valley; KEDT in Corpus Christi also sought a potential purchase of the station. The proceeds from the sale were used to repay nearly $800,000 in grants to the Corporation for Public Broadcasting. Sister station KMBH-FM, since re-called KJJF, was not affected by the sale of KMBH television; the diocese later withdrew the station from National Public Radio (NPR) and sold it to the Relevant Radio Catholic network. As of February 21, 2014, the facility status went from non-commercial educational to commercial.

In March 2014, the $8.5 million sale to MB Revolution LLC (like MBTV Texas Valley, a subsidiary of R Communications) was officially announced and filed with the FCC. The new owners then took control of KMBH through a local marketing agreement; though MB intended to program the station commercially, it remained a PBS station. Programming from the Diocese will continue to be produced from the KMBH studios and aired on a digital subchannel for eight hours each month. MB's owner, Robert Martínez-McCarter, already owns six radio stations in the Rio Grande Valley. On May 20, 2015, MB Revolution received FCC approval to buy the station.

By the start of 2016, PBS programming would move to the second subchannel, with .1 replaced with Cozi TV, a classic television network owned by NBCUniversal, and .3 replaced with "RTV-Música", a locally programmed Spanish-language music channel. On August 8, 2018, "RTV-Música" was simulcast on both the .1 and .3 subchannels, with Cozi TV programming airing on the third subchannel of KTLM. RTV Música later began airing programming from Teleritmo, a grupera music video channel owned by Multimedios Televisión.

On January 25, 2018, local utility work resulted in a power surge that damaged the KMBH transmitter. The station returned to air at reduced power in late July; however, efforts to ramp up to full power operation damaged the transmitter again, forcing KMBH off the air on February 11, 2019.

Sale to Entravision Communications and change to Fox
In August 2019, Entravision Communications, owners of full-power KNVO (channel 48) as well as low-power stations KFXV-LD/KXFX-CD and KCWT-CD in the Valley, announced it would acquire KMBH for $2.9 million. For attribution reasons related to its minority ownership by Univision and certain rights held by the company relating to its Univision affiliates, Entravision declared that KMBH would not air any Univision-owned network. With KMBH still off the air, Entravision added the national PBS feed to the 21.4 subchannel of its low-power KCWT-CD.

KMBH briefly returned to air on January 8, 2020, at reduced power with temporary facilities as it awaited being repacked to channel 16 in phase 8. The facility was reactivated on May 5, simulcasting KFXV-LD/KXFX-CD. The KFXV and KMBH call letters switched positions on May 27, 2020.

On October 1, 2021, MyNetworkTV (which was carried on KFXV and KMBH as a secondary affiliation) moved to Antenna TV O&O KGBT-TV (channel 4) also as a secondary affiliation.

Programming

Syndicated programming
Syndicated programming on KFXV includes Right This Minute, Extra, Access Daily, The Kelly Clarkson Show, The Real, Hot Bench, The People's Court, Justice for All with Judge Cristina Perez, Mom, Modern Family, TMZ, Entertainment Tonight, You Bet Your Life, Two and a Half Men, and Last Man Standing, among others.

Newscasts
On March 12, 2007, Entravision debuted "Fox 2 News at Nine" on XHRIO. The 30-minute 9 p.m. newscast, which airs Monday to Friday, was not the first in the market, as XHFOX had aired one in 2001, the final year of its affiliation, through a partnership with KRGV-TV. KFXV's sister Fox affiliate to the northwest in Laredo, KXOF-CD, carries KFXV's "Fox News South Texas" newscasts with some Laredo news and weather inserted into the programs.

Prior programming
KMBH-DT2 carried general PBS fare, as well as some programming pertaining to the Catholic faith, including Sunday Mass, a Spanish-language Bible study program, and a Catholic family issues program. KMBH was one of at least two PBS members run by a religious organization (KBYU-TV was the other, which left PBS in 2018), and was formerly one of at least three PBS members owned at least in part by a Catholic-related organization (along with WXEL-TV in West Palm Beach, Florida, which was sold to a community group in 2012, and WLAE-TV in New Orleans, which left PBS in 2013). Because of the Catholic-based ownership, KMBH occasionally refused to show programming that is contrary to the Catholic faith—one example is a 2007 Frontline documentary, "Hand of God", which dealt with sex abuse by clergymen; the station only aired it the next day as part of PBS' automated overnight schedule at 1 a.m., drawing complaints from viewers in support of the program.

Technical information

Subchannels
The station's digital signal is multiplexed:

KFXV used its former physical channel 38 as its virtual channel for most of its history telecasting in digital, opting not to remap to virtual channel 60. Under Entravision, KFXV began using virtual channel 60.

Prior to 2016, PBS was seen in the .1 position, with V-me (a Spanish-language public television network) seen on .2, and the Valley Catholic Network, the diocese's Catholic channel affiliated with EWTN, seen at .3.

References

External links

Television channels and stations established in 1982
Fox network affiliates
Bounce TV affiliates
Television stations in the Lower Rio Grande Valley
1982 establishments in Texas
Entravision Communications stations